Dipodillus is a genus of rodent in the family Muridae. It is sometimes classified as a subgenus of the genus Gerbillus. 

It contains the following species:
 Botta's gerbil (Dipodillus bottai)
 North African gerbil (Dipodillus campestris)
 Wagner's gerbil (Dipodillus dasyurus)
 Harwood's gerbil (Dipodillus harwoodi)
 James's gerbil (Dipodillus jamesi)
 Lowe's gerbil (Dipodillus lowei)
 Mackilligin's gerbil (Dipodillus mackilligini)
 Greater short-tailed gerbil (Dipodillus maghrebi)
 Rupicolous gerbil (Dipodillus rupicola)
 Lesser short-tailed gerbil (Dipodillus simoni)
 Somalian gerbil (Dipodillus somalicus)
 Khartoum gerbil (Dipodillus stigmonyx)
 Kerkennah Islands gerbil (Dipodillus zakariai)

References

 
Rodent genera
Taxa named by Fernand Lataste
Taxonomy articles created by Polbot